Bear Grylls: Mission Survive is a reality television show presented by Bear Grylls featuring eight celebrities on a 12-day survival mission. The celebrities are tested on fundamental principles of survival, and have to navigate through difficult terrains. Grylls is assisted by survival expert Megan Hine and former commando Scott Heffield, who accompany the celebrities. Their assessment of how the celebrities performed helps Bear Grylls decide whom to eliminate in each episode. The show was filmed in Costa Rica for the first series and moved to South Africa for the second series in 2016.

The first series aired in 2015 and was won by DJ and model Vogue Williams. Shortly after the first series aired, it was announced that the show would return in 2016 and was won by Arsenal L.F.C. player Alex Scott.

On 30 May 2016, ITV announced that Bear Grylls: Mission Survive would not be returning for a third series due to the falling ratings of series two.

Series 1 (2015)

Participants
The eight celebrities taking part in the series were announced on 4 February 2015:

Results summary

Colour key:

 Celebrity got through to the next episode.
 Celebrity was eliminated.
 Celebrity was the series runner-up.
 Celebrity was the series winner.

 No elimination this week
 Double elimination this week

Series 2 (2016)
The show returned for a second series on 3 March 2016. Coronation Street actor Ryan Thomas was due to participate in the series, but was dropped from the line-up in 2015.

Participants
The seven celebrities taking part in the series were announced on 18 February 2016:

Results summary

Colour key:

 Celebrity got through to the next episode.
 Celebrity was eliminated.
 Celebrity was the series runner-up.
 Celebrity was the series winner.

 There was no elimination in Episode 4.

Ratings
Episode viewing figures from BARB. Viewing figures do not include numbers from ITV HD or ITV +1.

Series 1 (2015)

Series 2 (2016)

References

External links
 

2010s British reality television series
2015 British television series debuts
2016 British television series endings
ITV reality television shows
English-language television shows
Television shows set in Costa Rica
Television series by All3Media